Abdoulaye Sidibé (born 9 February 2002) is a French professional footballer who plays as a winger for ligue 2 side AS Saint-Étienne.

Club career
On 1 July 2019, Sidibé signed his first professional contract with Saint-Étienne. He made his professional debut with Saint-Étienne in a 2–2 Ligue 1 tie with FC Nantes on 20 September 2020.

International career
Born in France, Sidibé is of Senegalese descent. He is a youth international for France.

References

External links
 
 Ligue 1 Profile
 

2002 births
Living people
Footballers from Paris
French footballers
France youth international footballers
French sportspeople of Senegalese descent
Association football wingers
AS Saint-Étienne players
Ligue 1 players
Championnat National 2 players